Joseph Ludwig Franz Ressel (June 29, 1793 – October 9, 1857) was an Austrian forester and inventor, who designed one of the first working ship's propellers. 

Ressel was born in Chrudim, Bohemia then part of the Holy Roman Empire ruled by the Habsburg monarchy, which became part of the Austrian Empire in 1804. His father Anton Hermann Ressel was a native German speaker, and his mother Marie Anna Konvičková was a native Czech speaker. He studied at the Linz Gymnasium,  Budweis (in today's České Budějovice) artillery school, University of Vienna and the Mariabrunn Forestry Academy at Mariabrunn Monastery then near (now in) Vienna.

He worked for the Austrian government as a forester in the more southern parts of the monarchy, including in Motovun, Istria. His work was to secure a supply of quality wood for the Navy. He worked in Landstrass (Kostanjevica on the Krka river in Carniola), where he tested his ship propellers for the first time. In 1821 he was transferred to Trieste, the biggest port of the Austrian Empire, where his tests were successful. He was awarded a propeller patent in 1827. He modified a steam-powered boat Civetta by 1829 and test-navigated it in the Trieste harbor at six knots before the steam conduits exploded. Because of this misfortune, the police banned further testing. The explosion was not caused by the propeller being tested, as many believed at the time.

As early as 1804, the American John Fitch is credited with a screw propeller, which was unsuccessful. In 1836, the Englishman Francis Pettit Smith tested a screw propeller similar to Ressel's. The first transatlantic journey of a ship powered by a screw-propeller was by the SS Great Britain in 1845. Propeller design stabilized in the 1880s.

Besides having been called "the inventor of the propeller," he was also called the inventor of the steamship and a monument to him in a park in Vienna commemorates him as "the one and only inventor of the screw propeller and steam shipping." He was also commemorated on Austria's 500 Schilling banknote in the mid-1960s (P139), which shows him on the front and the ship Civetta on the back.

Among Ressel's other inventions are pneumatic post and ball and cylinder bearings. He was granted numerous patents during his life.

Ressel also played an important role in the reforestation of the Karst Plateau near Trieste. A bronze statue of him was placed along the waterfront of Trieste on March 30, 2022.

He died in Laibach (now Ljubljana, the capital of Slovenia) and was buried there in St. Christopher's Cemetery in the Bežigrad district. His gravestone is displayed today in Navje Memorial Park.

References

Literature 
 Erhard Marschner: "Josef Ressel. Erfinder der Schiffsschraube - Seine Vorfahren und Nachkommen" [Josef Ressel. One of the designers of a ship's propeller - its ancestors and descendants], 1979, .
 Václav Gutwirth: "Vynálezce Josef Ressel" [Inventor Josef Ressel], 1943, Prague.
 Jiří Charvát, Pavel Kobetič et al.: "Josef Ressel a Chrudim" [Josef Ressel and Chrudim], 1986, published by the Chrudim Regional Museum. The museum keeps collection of porpotions about Ressel.

External links 
 3 (fast) vergessene Pioniere der Geschichte | Terra X – ZDF – The first segment is about Josef Ressel; German with machine-translated English subtitles.
Short biography
 History of propeller inventions

1793 births
1857 deaths
People from Chrudim
19th-century Czech people
19th-century Austrian people
Czech engineers
Czech inventors
Foresters